Trifluoromethylation in organic chemistry describes any organic reaction that introduces a trifluoromethyl group in an organic compound. Trifluoromethylated compounds are of some importance in pharmaceutical industry and agrochemicals. Several notable pharmaceutical compounds have a trifluoromethyl group incorporated: fluoxetine, mefloquine, Leflunomide, nulitamide, dutasteride, bicalutamide, aprepitant, celecoxib, fipronil, fluazinam, penthiopyrad, picoxystrobin, fluridone, norflurazon, sorafenib and triflurazin. A relevant agrochemical is trifluralin. The development of synthetic methods for adding trifluoromethyl groups to chemical compounds is actively pursued in academic research.

History
The first to investigate trifluoromethyl groups in relationship to biological activity was F. Lehmann in 1927. An early review appeared in 1958. An early synthetic method was developed by Frédéric Swarts in 1892, based on antimony fluoride. In this reaction benzotrichloride was reacted with SbF3 to form PhCF2Cl and
PhCF3. In the 1930s Kinetic Chemicals and IG Farben replaced SbF3 with HF.
The McLoughlin-Thrower reaction (1968) is an early coupling reaction using iodofluoroalkanes, iodoaromatic compounds and copper. In 1969 Kobayashi & Kumadaki adapted their protocol for trifluoromethylations.

Reagents

Trifluoromethyltrimethylsilane

Preparation of the trifluoromethyltrimethylsilane was reported by Ingo Ruppert in 1984. In 1989, Prakash and Olah first reported activation of TMSCF3 by fluoride to perform nucleophilic trifluoromethylation of carbonyl compounds. In the same year, Stahly described similar reactions for the synthesis of trifluoromethylated phenols and anilines. Since then TMSCF3 has been widely used as a nucleophilic trifluoromethylating agent.

An example is the trifluoromethylation of cyclohexanone in THF using tetrabutylammonium fluoride.

The substrates can be aryl halides. Potassium (trifluoromethyl)trimethoxyborate for this purpose has been synthesised from B(OMe)3, CF3SiMe3 and KF. Aryl functionalization by C-H activation has also been reported.

Sodium trifluoroacetate
Sodium trifluoroacetate as a reagent for trifluoromethylations was introduced by Matsui in 1981. In the original scope the substrate was an aromatic halide and the metal salt copper(I)iodide.

Trifluoromethane
Fluoroform (CF3H) has been employed as a trifluoromethylation reagent for aldehydes in combination with a strong base.

Trifluoroiodomethane
Trifluoroiodomethane is a reagent in aromatic coupling reactions. It has also been used with enones, for example with chalcone, a reaction catalysed by diethyl zinc and Wilkinson's catalyst:

Trifluoromethyl sulfone
Trifluoromethyl sulfone (PhSO2CF3) and trifluoromethyl sulfoxide (PhSOCF3) can be used for trifluoromethylations of electrophiles

Trifluoromethanesulfonyl chloride
Trifluoromethanesulfonyl chloride (or triflyl chloride, CF3SO2Cl) can be used in a highly efficient method to introduce a trifluoromethyl group to aromatic and heteroaromatic systems, including known pharmaceuticals such as Lipitor. The chemistry is general and mild, and uses a photoredox catalyst and a light source at room temperature.

Sodium trifluoromethanesulfinate
Sodium trifluoromethanesulfinate (CF3SO2Na) as a trifluoromethylation reagent was introduced by Langlois in 1991. The reaction requires t-butyl hydroperoxide and generally a metal and proceeds through a radical mechanism. The reagent has been applied with heterocyclic substrates

Umemoto reagents 
Umemoto reagents are (trifluoromethyl)dibenzoheterocyclic salts, such as 5-(trifluoromethyl)dibenzothiophenium triflate and 5-(trifluoromethyl)dibenzothiophenium tetrafluoroborate.

Trifluoromethyl-metal reagents
Many CF3-containing metal complexes have been prepared, and some are useful for trifluoromethylation. The most obvious reagent is CF3Li, which can be generated by lithium-iodide exchange.  This compound is however unstable even at low temperatures.  It degrades to lithium fluoride and difluorocarbene.  Trifluoromethyl copper(I) reagents are more useful.  These reagents are generated in situ by reaction of CF3I with copper powder in polar solvents.   Hg(CF3)2, prepared by decarboxylation of the trifluoroacetate, has proven useful for the trifluoromethylation of other metals.

Reaction types

Aromatic coupling reactions
In coupling reactions between aromatic compounds and metal-trifluoromethyl complexes the metal is usually copper, Pd and Ni are less prominent. The reactions are stoichiometric or catalytic. In the McLoughlin-Thrower reaction (1962) iodobenzene reacts with trifluoroiodomethane (CF3I) and copper powder  in dimethylformamide at 150 °C to trifluoromethylbenzene. The intermediate in this reaction type is a perfluoromethyl-metal complex.

A palladium acetate catalysed reaction described in 1982 used zinc powder with the main intermediate believed to be CF3ZnI with Pd(0) is the active catalyst. The first copper catalysed coupling was reported in 2009 and based on an iodoarene, a trifluoromethylsilane, copper iodide and 1,10-phenanthroline. Variations include another CF3 donor potassium (trifluoromethyl)trimethoxyborate, the use of aryl boronic acids or the use of a trifluoromethyl sulfonium salt or the use of a trifluoromethylcopper(I) phenanthroline complex. A catalytic palladium catalysed reaction was reported in 2010 using aryl halides, (trifluoromethyl)triethylsilane and allylpalladium chloride dimer

Radical trifluoromethylation
In radical trifluoromethylation the active species is the trifluoromethyl free radical. Reagents such as bromotrifluoromethane and haloform have been used for this purpose but in response to the Montreal Protocol alternatives such as trifluoroiodomethane have been developed as replacement. One particular combination is CF3I / triethylborane
Other reagents that generate the CF3 radical are sodium trifluoromethanesulfinate and bis(trifluoroacetyl) peroxide.

In the CF3 radical the fluorine atom is an electron-withdrawing group via the inductive effect but also a weak pi donor through interaction of the fluorine lone pair with the radical center's SOMO. Compared to the methyl radical the CF3 radical is pyramidal (angle 107.8 °C ) with a large inversion barrier, electrophilic and also more reactive. In reaction with styrene it is 440 times more reactive. An early report (1949) describes the photochemical reaction of iodotrifluoromethane with ethylene to 3-iodo-1,1,1-trifluoropropane. Reagents that have been reported for the direct trifluoromethylation of arenes are CF3I, CF3Br (thermal or photochemical), silver trifluoroacetate/TiO2 (photochemical) and sodium trifluoromethanesulfinate/Cu(OSO2CF3)2/tBuOOH.

Nucleophilic trifluoromethylation
In nucleophilic trifluoromethylation the active species is the CF3− anion. It was, however, widely believed that the trifluoromethyl anion is a transient species and thus cannot be isolated or observed in the condensed phase.  Contrary to the popular belief, the CF3 anion, with [K(18-crown-6)]+ as a countercation, was produced and characterized by Prakash and coworkers. The challenges associated with observation of CF3 anion are alluded to its strong basic nature and its tendency to form pentacoordinated silicon species, such as [Me3Si(CF3)2]− or [Me3Si(F)(CF3)]−.

The reactivity of fluoroform in combination with a strong base such as t-BuOK with carbonyl compounds in DMF is an example. Here CF3− and DMF form an hemiaminolate adduct ([Me2NCH(O)CF3]K).

Electrophilic trifluoromethylation
In electrophilic trifluoromethylation the active trifluoromethyl donor group carries a positive charge. Production of an CF3+ cation has been described as "extremely hard"  The first relevant reagent, a diaryl(trifluoromethyl) sulfonium salt (Ar2S+CF3SbF6−) was developed in 1984 by reaction of an aryltrifluoromethyl sulfoxide 1 with SF3+SbF6− followed by reaction with an electron-rich arene. The reagent was used in trifluoromethylation of a thiophenolate.
S-(trifluoromethyl)dibenzothiophenium tetrafluoroborate is a commercially available and known trifluoromethylation reagent based on the same principle first documented in 1990. In this type of compound sulfur has been replaced by oxygen, selenium and tellurium. Examples of substrates that have been investigated are pyridine, aniline, triphenylphosphine and the lithium salt of phenylacetylene.

Another group of trifluoromethyl donors are hypervalent iodine(III)–CF3 reagents for example 3,3-dimethyl-1-(trifluoromethyl)-1,2-benziodoxole. Some of these are known as Togni reagents, such as Togni reagent II. Substrates are thiols, alcohols, phosphines, (hetero) arenes, unactivated olefins and unsaturated carboxylic acids.

The reaction mechanism of electrophilic trifluoromethylations has been described as controversial with polar substitution or single electron transfer as likely candidates.

Asymmetric trifluoromethylation
In asymmetric trifluoromethylation the trifluoromethyl group is added to the substrate in an enantioselective way. Ruppert's reagent has been used for this purpose in an asymmetric induction approach to functionalise chiral amino acid derivates, saccharides, and steroids.
Because Ruppert's reagent requires a tetraalkylammonium fluoride, chiral ammonium fluorides have been employed in asymmetric catalysis.
In the field of electrophilic trifluoromethylation an early contribution involved reaction of a metal enolate with a trifluoromethyl chalcogen salt in presence of a chiral boron catalyst.

More recent examples of highly enantioselective methods for the α-trifluoromethylation of carbonyls are available through enamine catalysis of aldehydes (photoredox or iodonium), copper catalysis of β-ketoesters, and radical addition to zirconium enolates.

References

Organic reactions